Terje Tysland (born 14 April 1951) is a Norwegian singer, songwriter, guitarist and accordion player.

Tysland was born in Namsos. From 1969 to 1976 he was member of the rock group Prudence, led by Åge Aleksandersen. His first solo album was Stakkars klovn from 1977, and he had a musical breakthrough with the album Mytji arti from 1978. His song "Ringdans" reached number one position on the hit list Norsktoppen in 1981. The album Gutta på by'n from 1987 was a commercial success, and includes the country duo "Heile livet" with Claudia Scott. His next albums include Kainn æ få lov from 1988, Værra me’ mæ hjæm from 1990, the live album Best i levende live from 1990 and Vik fra mæ! from 1992. The album Fullar enn fullmånen from 1993 was a collaboration with the hard rock band Clawfinger, and on Hurra for mæ from 1995 he collaborated with Oppdal Spellemannslag. 1996 saw the appearance of the collection album For ett mas! Det beste – på godt og vondt. Later albums include Ein runde te (1997), Din jævel! (2000), the collection album 25 år med gitter & stas (2002), and Det goe’ liv (2004).

References

1951 births
Living people
Musicians from Namsos
Norwegian musicians